The Tezwa River is a river in the Kitimat Ranges of the Coast Mountains in British Columbia, Canada.  It is part of the Kitlope River drainage, feeding that river via the head of Kitlope Lake.

Name
The name was created by Frank Swannell, government surveyor, in 1921, suggesting that as a form easier to pronounce for Europeans than the Haisla name told him by a native he met along the Kitlope River, Hwuis-u-tezwa.  On a map of the same year he used Hwuis-y-yez-wa River.

See also
List of British Columbia rivers

References

Rivers of the Kitimat Ranges
Haisla